Anthony Wilder "Tony" Miller was the United States Deputy Secretary of Education, confirmed on July 24, 2009 to replace Raymond Simon, who resigned from office on January 20, 2009. Miller was a co-founder at The Vistria Group, LLC and is currently the Chairman of Apollo Education Group, parent company of the University of Phoenix.

Career

Prior to joining the Department of Education, Miller had been an operating partner since 2007 with Silver Lake Partners, an investment firm. From 2003 to 2006, Miller was executive vice president of operations at LRN Corporation, a provider of governance and compliance software and legal research services. He also worked for 10 years at McKinsey & Company, where he was a partner that specialized in growth strategies, operating performance improvement, and restructuring for companies throughout the United States, Europe, and Asia.

From 1984 to 1990, Miller also worked for Delco Electronics, a subsidiary of GM Hughes Electronics, where he managed regional channel marketing.

In education, Miller worked with the Los Angeles Unified School District from 1997 to 2000, developing student achievement goals and strategies, budgets and operating plans, and designing metrics and processes for monitoring school performances.

From 2009 to 2013, Miller served as Deputy Secretary of Education in the Obama Administration.

In 2017, Anthony W. Miller became Board Chair of Apollo Education Group, the parent company of [[University of Phoenix]], a for-profit college. He and Vistria Group co-CEO Martin Nesbitt are board members of the University of Phoenix.

Education
Miller holds an M.B.A. from the Stanford Graduate School of Business and a bachelor's degree in industrial engineering from Purdue University.

Personal life
Miller and his wife, Carole, have one son and reside in Arlington, Virginia.

References

External links
Anthony W. Miller Bio at ED.gov

Year of birth missing (living people)
Living people
Stanford Graduate School of Business alumni
Purdue University College of Engineering alumni
United States Deputy Secretaries of Education
Obama administration personnel
Silver Lake (investment firm) people